"Roll Away Your Stone" is the fourth single by London rock quartet, Mumford & Sons, taken from their debut album, Sigh No More. It was released as a Digital Download on 3 June 2010 and was released as the third and final single from Sigh No More in the United States on 7 June 2011.  The song begins with an instrumental version of the Irish jig, "Merrily Kissed the Quaker". The song appeared in the 2012 documentary film, Kony 2012.

The song includes a reference to Macbeth. The repeated line, "stars hide your fires," is also spoken by Macbeth, who conceals his ambition for the throne in Act 1 of the play.

Track listing
iTunes Single/CD Single/7" Vinyl

Chart performance
Despite being added to BBC Radio 1's A Playlist in May 2010, the single failed to crack the Top 100 upon physical release in June. The single managed to peak at number 141 on the UK Singles Chart.

Weekly charts

Year-end charts

Release history

References

2010 singles
Mumford & Sons songs
2009 songs
Island Records singles
Songs written by Marcus Mumford
Song recordings produced by Markus Dravs
Songs written by Ted Dwane
Songs written by Ben Lovett (British musician)
Songs written by Winston Marshall
2011 singles